With What Shall I Keep Warm? is an album released in 2009 by Canadian singer-songwriter Jane Siberry.  The album artwork features both the names Issa and Jane Siberry (she changed her name back to Jane Siberry around the time of the release).  It is "the second of a story told in three parts," the first being Dragon Dreams.

Track listing
"Eden (Can't Get This Body Thing Right)"
"Hide Not Your Light"
"This Is Not the Way"
"Phoenix (for teenagers)"
"In My Dream"
"Further In the Garden (interlude)"
"Take Me To My Tent"
"Tiny Lies Are Killing Me"
"Then We Heard A Shout"
"Mama Hereby"
"Walk On Water"

Jane Siberry albums
2009 albums